Ko Kwang-min (or  ; born 21 September 1988) is a South Korean footballer who plays as a midfielder for Sabah FC in the Malaysia Super League.

Club career 
In 2011, Ko Kwang-min joined FC Seoul

He recorded assist in Group stage of 2013 AFC Champions League.

He scored 2 goals in 2014 Korean FA Cup.

On 18 February, Ko Kwang-min joined Sabah in the Malaysia Super League.

International career
Ko got his first call up to the senior South Korea side for 2018 FIFA World Cup qualifiers against Qatar and Iran in October 2016.

References

External links 
 
 Ko Kwang-min – National Team stats at KFA 

1988 births
Living people
Association football midfielders
South Korean footballers
FC Seoul players
Sabah F.C. (Malaysia) players
Hwaseong FC players
K League 1 players
K3 League (2007–2019) players
Malaysia Super League players
Footballers from Seoul
Ajou University alumni